László Hajdu (born August 23, 1947) is a Hungarian economist and politician, who has served as Mayor of the 15th district of Budapest from 2014 to 2018, a position which he also held between 1996 and 2010. He was replaced by Tamás László.

Hajdu also represented District XV (Budapest Constituency XXIII) in the National Assembly of Hungary from 1994 to 2010, and again since 2018.

Personal life
He is married to Krisztina Mária Katalin Onódi, a public servant, since 1970. The couple has three children - a son László (born in 1970) and two daughters, Katalin (born in 1975) and Mónika (born in 1979).

References

1947 births
Living people
Hungarian economists
Members of the Hungarian Socialist Workers' Party
Hungarian Socialist Party politicians
Democratic Coalition (Hungary) politicians
Members of the National Assembly of Hungary (1994–1998)
Members of the National Assembly of Hungary (1998–2002)
Members of the National Assembly of Hungary (2002–2006)
Members of the National Assembly of Hungary (2006–2010)
Members of the National Assembly of Hungary (2018–2022)
Mayors of places in Hungary
People from Békés County